José Mercado Luna (6 August 1928 – 18 May 2017) was a Mexican footballer. He competed in the men's tournament at the 1948 Summer Olympics.

References

External links
 

1928 births
2017 deaths
Mexican footballers
Mexico international footballers
Olympic footballers of Mexico
Footballers at the 1948 Summer Olympics
Sportspeople from Jalisco
Association football midfielders
Atlas F.C. footballers
Zamora CF footballers
Club Celaya footballers
Mexican expatriate footballers
Mexican expatriate sportspeople in Spain
Expatriate footballers in Spain